The Politics of Alberta are centred on a provincial government resembling that of the other Canadian provinces, namely a constitutional monarchy and parliamentary democracy.  The capital of the province is Edmonton, where the provincial Legislative Building is located.

The unicameral legislature, the Legislative Assembly of Alberta, has 87 members. Government is conducted after the Westminster model. The provincial government's revenue, although it is often described as predominantly coming from the province's resource base, actually is derived from a variety of sources. Nonrenewable resource revenue provided the government with 24 percent of its revenue in 2010–11, with about the same coming from individual income tax, 14 per cent from grants from the federal government, and about eight percent coming from both corporations and the government's own business activities. Alberta is the only province in Canada without a provincial sales tax (see also Sales taxes in Canada).

Alberta has a system of municipal government similar to that of the other provinces.

History of Alberta politics

Provincial
Alberta's parliamentary governments are determined by general elections held every three to five years. Five years is the maximum term allowed. By-elections are conducted between the general elections to fill seats left vacant by death or resignation. In each election (so far) a single party has taken a majority of the seats, although sometimes it does this after receiving less than half the votes cast.

Alberta's politics has historically been one of long-lasting governments with government changes being few and far between.

For the first 16 years Alberta was a province it had a Liberal government. Through the 1910s the growing farmer movement forced reforms out of this government and, embodied in the United Farmers of Alberta group, it launched itself into direct politics, winning power in the first election it contested.

Louise McKinney and Roberta MacAdams were the first women elected to the Legislative Assembly, in the 1917 election. They were also the first women in any legislature of the British Empire. Irene Parlby was the first woman appointed to the provincial Cabinet, in 1921.

Alberta was swept up in the wave of "prairie populism" that took place after the First World War; from 1921 to 1935 the United Farmers of Alberta headed the longest-lived of the farmers' governments that won power in Canada during this time. It made several reforms including changing Alberta's election system. Ranked voting was brought in --Single transferable voting proportional representation in the cities and Instant-runoff voting outside the cities. The UFA lost all its seats in 1935 when William Aberhart's Social Credit party (Socred) was elected on a radical monetary reform platform. After Aberhart's death in 1943 and changing economic conditions, the Socred government moved to the right under Premier Ernest Manning.

For over 80 years, the province was governed by right of centre parties. The Socreds were succeeded in 1971 by the Progressive Conservatives. Ralph Klein was premier of Alberta from 1992 to 2006 and despite multiple controversies, he remained the leader of the Progressive Conservative party and thus the province although only 55 percent of delegates from his party signified their approval of his leadership on the spring of 2006, pushing him into retirement.

Left wing Edmonton was an exception to the province's post–Second World War conservative voting pattern, earning it the nickname "Redmonton". Edmonton city residents, to a larger extent than elsewhere, tend to vote for the Liberal Party of Alberta and Alberta New Democrats. Their preferences is often obscured by the first-past-the-post electoral system. No Labour or CCF or NDP candidate won an Edmonton seat from 1955 to 1982, despite the large left vote in the city overall, in part due to the cancellation of the STV/IRV voting systems in 1956. The 2004 provincial election was an example of how the city got its nickname "Redmonton"; Liberal and New Democrat candidates won 15 of the city's 18 seats. 

While Tories won 13 of Edmonton's 18 seats in 2008, Klein's successor, Ed Stelmach, represented a riding just outside Edmonton and was perceived to be less connected to the interests of the energy corporations whose headquarters are in Calgary.

Stelmach gave way in 2011 to Alison Redford, the province's first female premier. She led the Tories to a 12th consecutive election victory in 2012.  Redford was forced to resign in 2014, and was ultimately succeeded by former federal minister Jim Prentice. The conservative dominance of Alberta politics was broken in 2015.

2015, the Alberta New Democratic Party formed government for the first time, and Rachel Notley became Alberta's 17th premier.

On April 16, 2019, the 2019 Alberta general election saw Jason Kenney and his new United Conservative Party (UCP) sweep to power, winning 63 of 87 seats in the Alberta legislature, returning the province to conservative politics. This was the only election in Alberta history to dethrone an incumbent government after only a single term. However, the UCP received just 54 percent of the vote, the first-past-the-post system inflating the avalanche of switched seats and exaggerating the appearance of the party's popularity.

Federal
Alberta's federal representation mostly echoed that of its provincial politics. Like in provincial elections, federal elections again and again saw the leading party (no matter what its label) receive more than its due share of members and the other parties were under-represented. 

When Liberals were in power in the Legislative Assembly, most of the province's MPs were Liberal. The 1917 election was an exception - The Union government's use of the soldier vote meant that Liberal candidates with majority support among voters voting in the riding were not declared elected.

Then when the United Farmers dominated from 1921 to 1935, most of the Alberta MPs were of that party. Calgary was a labour stronghold and its election of two Labour MPs in 1921 was un-equalled anywhere else in the country.

When Social Credit came into vogue, winning its first electoral successes in 1935, federal representation also changed to being mostly Socred. The Social Credit party under Ernest Manning turned right-wing in the 1940s, but this apparently mirrored changing sentiment among Alberta voters. And the party maintained its power provincially and its hold on most of the federal seats until the 1970s.

Alberta's conservative leaning was pronounced on the federal level. The province was the heartland of the Reform Party of Canada and its successor, the Canadian Alliance. These parties were the second-largest political parties in the federal Parliament from 1997 to 2003 and they were located on the political right. 

The Canadian Alliance merged with the Progressive Conservative Party to form today's Conservative Party of Canada.  The Conservatives' former leader and ex–Prime Minister Stephen Harper, moved to Alberta in the 1980s and represented a Calgary riding; Rona Ambrose, the party's interim leader and Leader of the Opposition (2015–17), is also an Albertan. 

Alberta elected no Liberal 1958-1963, 1965-1968, 1972-1993, 2006-2015, 2019 to present. In those years Liberals were in power 1965-1968, 1972-1979, 1980-1984, 1993 to 2006, 2019 to the present. In those five periods, a total of 31 years, Alberta did not have direct representation in the federal cabinet. This included the years when PM Pierre Trudeau tried to create a National Energy Program. It failed. To this day, Canada is one of only a few major countries without a national energy plan.

Rural Alberta ridings typically give the leading party, whether it is the Conservatives, or the United Farmers, Social Credit, Reform and the Alliance before them, some of the highest margins in the country; in many cases, the successful candidate receives more than two-thirds of the vote.

Provincial political culture
Alberta's political stability has led to a series of political continuity.  Voters have turned a government out of office only five times in 115 years. The two governments prior to 2015 were among the longest-lived in the Commonwealth.

Alberta elections are held using a first-past-the-post system so MLAs elected do not necessarily receive a majority of the votes in the constituency, and the party with a majority of the seats in the Legislature does not necessarily receive a majority of votes cast in the election. For example, in the 2004 election, the Progressive Conservative party won 61 of 83 seats (73% of the seats) but obtained only 47% of the popular vote. 

During the UFA and early Socred government periods, elections were conducted using transferable preferential ballots (see ranked voting). Members in cities ran in city-wide districts, under the single transferable voting system ensuring city-wide proportional representation in the Legislature; members outside the cities were elected using Instant-runoff voting. Many of the opposition parties today include electoral reform in their policies.

In its history, Alberta has seen only six distinct governments, with no party ever returning to form government under the same label again after defeat. (The UFA government of 1921-1935 can be seen as a precursor of the NDP government of 2015-2019 as it organizationally was its forerunner. The present UCP government is an organizational descendant of the old Progressive-Conservative Party that reigned from 1971 to 2015.)

All Alberta elections have resulted in a majority government, a trend unseen in any other Canadian province. (But frequently the most popular party was the choice of less than half the voters.) Even with crossing the floor or by-elections, Alberta has never had a minority government. Each government has held a majority of seats in the Legislature.

Liberal to UFA to Social Credit (1905-1971)

Progressive Conservative to NDP to UCP (1971 to present)

Some Albertans continue to resent the imposition in the 1980s of the National Energy Program (NEP) by the Liberal federal government of Prime Minister Pierre Trudeau. It was considered to be an intrusion by the federal government in an area of provincial responsibility. This led some Albertans to advocate separation of the province from Canada but this advocacy (despite occasional surges in interest) has never resulted in electoral success. Neither, however, has the Liberal Party of Canada enjoyed much success in Alberta (outside of Edmonton) since that time. The NEP was ended when the Progressive Conservative Party of Canada, led by Brian Mulroney, formed the federal government following the 1984 federal election.

In the 2006 election, the federal Conservative Party of Canada won all the seats in Alberta, providing them with a complete sweep of the province. However, the NDP won the seat of Edmonton—Strathcona in the election of 2008, denying the Conservatives a sweep of the province in this election. No Alberta seats changed parties in the 2011 election, in which the Conservatives went from a minority government to a parliamentary majority. In all three elections, many of the Conservative candidates were elected with large majorities of the vote.  Alberta has for decades been considered a conservative fortress, no matter which right-of-centre party they may have chosen to support.  Albertans followed strong support for the Progressive Conservatives in the 1980s with the same degree of support for the Reform Party, and the Canadian Alliance in the 1990s, finally delivering a clean sweep for the new Conservative Party of Canada only a few years after its creation in 2003–2004.

However, small disaffection with the Conservative Party of Canada over policies enacted during its minority government such as Equalization payments in Canada and the Conservatives' reversal on income trusts led to the founding of the nascent federal Party of Alberta, in 2006.  Provincially, while the Progressive Conservative Party of Alberta had been in power for 40 years, they continued to win large majorities in the Legislative Assembly, winning 72 out of 83 seats in the March 2008 provincial election, although with declining popularity and lowering voter turn-out, reflecting increasing disfavour among ordinary Albertans regarding the government's market-first policies, its low quality of health and education services, and its flat-income tax policy. 
As well, for the first time since the 1980s, the PCs faced a challenge from the right wing, the upstart Wildrose Alliance Party. A November 2009 poll said the new party had 28% support, just 6 points behind the governing PCs. In polls, the Wildrose Party had a double digit lead over the PCs in December 2009, with 39% versus 25% each for the PCs and Alberta Liberals.

In April 2015, Jim Prentice called an election for May 5, citing the need for a mandate in order to make longer-term economic changes. Though initial polls had the PCs in the lead, as the election approached they fell behind the opposition Wildrose party, and the NDP. On May 5 the NDP gained 53 seats, winning a majority government under Rachel Notley.

The United Conservative Party (UCP) was established in July 2017 as a merger between the Progressive Conservative Association of Alberta and the Wildrose Party. When established, the UCP immediately formed the Official Opposition in the Legislative Assembly of Alberta. The UCP won a majority mandate in the 2019 Alberta general election to form the government of Alberta.

Finance

Budget 
The 2016-2017 budget contained a $10.4 billion deficit, with $41.1 billion in revenue and $51.1 billion in expenditures. The budget also contained a $700 million risk adjustment, which was intended to reflect "volatility of Alberta’s resource revenue."

See also

 List of premiers of Alberta
 List of Alberta general elections
 List of political parties in Alberta
 Politics of Canada
 Political culture of Canada
 Council of the Federation

References